Events from the year 1785 in the Dutch Republic

Events

 - Treaty of Fontainebleau (1785)

Births

Deaths

References

1785 in the Dutch Republic
1780s in the Dutch Republic
Years of the 18th century in the Dutch Republic